Fashions of 1934 is a 1934 American pre-Code musical comedy film directed by William Dieterle with musical numbers created and directed by Busby Berkeley. The screenplay by F. Hugh Herbert and Carl Erickson was based on the story The Fashion Plate by Harry Collins and Warren Duff.  The film stars William Powell, Bette Davis, Hugh Herbert and Frank McHugh, and has songs by Sammy Fain (music) and Irving Kahal (lyrics).  Sometime after its initial release, the title Fashions of 1934 was changed to Fashions, replacing the original title with an insert card stating "William Powell in 'Fashions'".

Plot
When the Manhattan investment firm of Sherwood Nash (William Powell) goes broke, he joins forces with his partner Snap (Frank McHugh) and fashion designer Lynn Mason (Bette Davis) to provide discount shops with cheap copies of Paris couture dresses. Lynn discovers that top designer Oscar Baroque (Reginald Owen) gets his inspiration from old costume books, and she begins to create designs the same way, signing each one with the name of an established designer.

Sherwood realizes Baroque's companion, the alleged Grand Duchess Alix (Verree Teasdale), is really Mabel McGuire, his old friend from Hoboken, New Jersey, and threatens to reveal her identity unless she convinces Baroque to design the costumes of a musical revue in which she will star. Baroque buys a supply of ostrich feathers from Sherwood's crony Joe Ward (Hugh Herbert) and starts a fashion rage.

Sherwood then opens Maison Elegance, a new Paris fashion house that's a great success until Baroque discovers Lynn is forging his sketches. He has him arrested, but Sherwood convinces the police to give him time to straighten out the situation. He crashes Baroque and Alix's wedding and promises to humiliate the designer by publicly revealing who his bride really is unless Baroque withdraws the charges. The designer agrees and purchases Maison Elegance from Sherwood, who assures Lynn he'll never get involved in another illegal activity if she returns to America with him.

Cast

 William Powell as Sherwood Nash
 Bette Davis as Lynn Mason
 Frank McHugh as Snap
 Reginald Owen as Oscar Baroque
 Verree Teasdale as Grand Duchess Alix
 Hugh Herbert as Joe Ward
 Henry O'Neill as Duryea
 Phillip Reed as Jimmy Blake
 Gordon Westcott as Harry Brent
 Dorothy Burgess as Glenda
 Etienne Girardot as Glass
 William Burress as Feldman
 Nella Walker as Mrs. Van Tyle
 Spencer Charters as Man removing telephone
 Harry Beresford as Paris bookseller

Cast notes:
 Arthur Treacher, appearing in his fourth Hollywood film, played his first part as a butler, a role he was to play many times in his long career.

Production

With this film, Warner Bros. chief Jack L. Warner tried to change Bette Davis' screen persona by putting her in a platinum blonde wig and false eyelashes and dressing her in glamorous costumes. The actress, who had been trying to convince the studio head to loan her to RKO so she could portray slatternly waitress Mildred Rogers in Of Human Bondage, was appalled at the transformation, complaining they were trying to turn her into Greta Garbo. In an interview with Photoplay editor Kathryn Dougherty, she complained, "I can't get out of these awful ruts. They just won't take me seriously. Look at me in this picture all done up like a third-rate imitation of the MGM glamour queens. That isn't me. I'll never be a clothes horse or romantic symbol."  To Gerald Clarke of Time she lamented, "I looked like somebody dressed up in mother's clothes. But it was a great break because I learned from the experience. I'll never let them do that to me again. Ever!"

Filming took place at Warner Bros. Burbank studios in 1933, under the working titles King of Fashion and Fashion Follies of 1934. Warners listed writers Gene Markey and Katherine Scola as having adapted the original story that was the basis of the film, but according to the Screen Writers Guild they had nothing to do with the project.

Songs
The film's musical numbers included "Spin a Little Web of Dreams" and "Broken Melody" by Sammy Fain and Irving Kahal, and "Mon Homme (My Man)" by Maurice Yvain, Albert Willemetz and Jacques Charles. Harry Warren wrote the untitled theme that accompanies the fashion show.

Reception

Box office
The film was considered a box office disappointment for Warner Bros. According to their records, it earned $570,000 domestically and $395,000 internationally.

Critical reception
The New York Times described it as "a brisk show" and added, "The story is lively, the gowns are interesting and the Busby Berkeley spectacles with Hollywood dancing girls are impressive . . . William Dieterle, that expert director who has been responsible for several imaginative pictures, does well by this particular production."

Variety called it "a bit far-fetched and inconsistent . . . but it has color, flash, dash, class, girls and plenty of clothes . . . Just why and how Bette Davis enters the picture never quite rings true."

References

External links

 
 
 
 

1934 films
1934 musical comedy films
1930s American films
1930s English-language films
1930s romantic musical films
American black-and-white films
American musical comedy films
American romantic comedy films
American romantic musical films
Films about fashion in France
Films directed by William Dieterle
Films set in Paris
Films with screenplays by F. Hugh Herbert
Warner Bros. films